The Sadgop sub-caste is a Bengali Hindu Yadav (Gopa) caste, found among the Bengali people of West Bengal, Assam, Tripura, Odisha, Jharkhand, parts of Bihar state in India and Bangladesh. Traditionally they are engaged in dairy-farming and cultivation. However, historically the Sadgop kings had ruled some parts of Bengal such as Gopbhum, Narajole, Narayangarh and Balarampur. They are one of the fourteen castes belonging to 'Nabasakh' group. They are recognized as a General caste.

Origin

Etymology
The Sadgop name is derived from two sanskrit word Sad and Gope, which means clean or good Gopes.

Origin
The Sadgops are an offshoot of the pastoral Gopa caste who broke away from the main caste before the middle of the sixteenth century. Their switch to agriculture was only 'the starting point of rise to eminence'. Through extending their activities to trade, they established control over the land they had put under the plough. Thus, leaders from the group acquired political power at the local level. Later on the group also ventured into trade and worked as officials of the state and the big Zamindars. Members of the new group also made achievements in the fields of religion, and from dissident Gop families came popular saints like Syamananda and the founder of the influential Kartabhaja sect, Aulchand. In the process, they changed their jati affiliation by adding sad (sat, 'clean') to their name, thus becoming Sadgops.

The Sadgops believe they have descended from Lord Krishna.

History

Varna
Sadgops  have generally been considered as clean shudras (sat-shudras) in the caste structure of Bengal. Like south India social groups of east India usually divided in two grades - Brahmins and Shudras.

Sanskritisation
In the 1910s, Sadgops along with Ahirs, Gops, Gopals etc began claiming kshatriya status based on claimed descent from the legendary king Yadu. The Yadav-kshatriya movement attracted communities in the Gangetic plain who were associated with a combination of cultivation, cattle-herding, and dairy farming.

Present circumstances
The Sadgop consist of a number of sub-divisions. They are an endogamous group and practice gotra exogamy. The Sadgop are mainly a landholding community, but many Sadgop have settled in Kolkata and other cities of West Bengal. Their own community organization is named as Bangiya Sadgop Samiti.

Notable people 
 Rani Shiromani, Zamindar of Karnagarh, one of the leaders of Chuar Rebellion
 Mahendralal Sarkar, Indian physician, founder of Indian Association for the Cultivation of Science

See also
Gopa
Yadav
Gopbhum

References

Bengali Hindu castes
Social groups of Bihar
Social groups of West Bengal
Social groups of Jharkhand